Biddulphiophycidae or Biddulphiineae is a grouping of Centrales. In some taxonomic schemes Centrales or Centric diatoms are named Coscinodiscophyceae and may have different naming of suborders and families.

Description
Valves primarily bipolar. They do not have a marginal ring of processes.

See also
Coscinodiscineae

References

Coscinodiscophyceae

SAR supergroup suborders